Ammar Al-Chalabi is Professor of Neurology and Complex Disease Genetics at the Maurice Wohl Clinical Neuroscience Institute at King's College London, where he is also head of the Department of Basic and Clinical Neuroscience and Director of the King's Motor Neuron Disease Research Centre. In 2020, he received the Forbes Norris Award from the International Alliance Of Als/Mnd Associations and was a co-winner of the Healey Center International Prize for Innovation in ALS. His other awards include the Sheila Essey Award from the American Academy of Neurology and the Charcot Young Investigator Award from the Motor Neurone Disease Association. In 2021 he was appointed Senior Investigator at the National Institute for Health Research (NIHR).

References

Further reading

External links
Faculty page

Living people
Academics of King's College London
Alumni of King's College London
Alumni of the University of Leicester
Year of birth missing (living people)
NIHR Senior Investigators